Choi Yeo-jin (born July 27, 1983) is a South Korean-Canadian model-turned-actress.

Career
Choi Yeo-jin was born in South Korea, but after her parents divorced, they emigrated to Canada when she was in the first year of middle school. She dreamed of becoming a ballerina, but had to give that up after her family went through some financial difficulties.

She debuted in the entertainment business via the Super Elite Model Contest held in Canada in 2001. Choi went on a leave of absence from George Brown College (she was majoring in Hotel Management) to pursue an entertainment career in Korea. She has since starred in several television series, like Dream High 2, and films, notably Surgeon Bong Dal-hee, Golden Bride, My Woman, More Charming by the Day and I Need Romance.

In 2012 she gained popularity due to her stint on reality show Dancing with the Stars, taking the top spot six times out of 11 competitions, and eventually winning. Choi said, "Viewers like my dancing more than my acting. I was kind of frustrated as an actress because I always played the same kind of characters and ended up projecting stereotypes, which could bore viewers. But now I'm much happier because I can turn into a glamorous dancer every time I get on stage."

Filmography

Television series

Film

Television show

Music video

Books

Awards and nominations

References

External links

 
 
 
 

1983 births
Living people
South Korean television actresses
South Korean film actresses
South Korean female models
Canadian actresses of Korean descent
Models from Seoul